Roohi may refer to:

 Roohi (1981 film), an Indian Hindi-language film by S.U. Syed
 Roohi (2021 film), an Indian Hindi-language comedy horror film by Hardik Mehta
 Roohi Bano (1951–2019), Pakistani actress
 Roohi Zuberi (born 1959), Indian women's rights activist